Biebel is the title character of a Flemish satirical comic strip series written by Marc Legendre, under the pseudonym of Ikke. It was created in 1983 for the magazine Robbedoes and was published until 2002.

Biebel successfully appeared in 28 comic albums published by Standaard Uitgeverij, the first of which was released in 1985, and the series were also published in the magazine Suske en Wiske Weekblad.

Concept

Biebel is a bald headed boy (Jesus) with a sarcastic attitude towards life. His best friend Reggie is more happy and carefree and thus an irritation to Biebel. Many Biebel comics are gag-a-day pages, but some are longer stories.

Comic Albums 

 De Biebelstory
 De Biebeltochten
  De Biebelsporten
  Op Bijna Algemene Aanvraag
  De Biebelfeesten
  De Biebelromances
  Schoolonzin
 Euh?
  Kort Geknipt?!
  Het Avontuurlijke Avontuur
  Biebel Tegen Ted Vedet
 Sportkot
  Snotneuzen In De Sneeuw
  Om Te Stelen
  Bangelijk
  Mafkees
 Dinges
  Mislukt
  Slapmans
  Parels Voor De Zwijnen
 Kassa Kassa
 Soepvlees
  Een Beetje Feest
  Virus
  Opgeruimd
  Halve Zolen
  Paladijs-eiland
  De doos

References

External links 
 Peter Leysen, Biebel was meteen een schot in de roos (en dat voor een Vlaming!) , ZozoLala
 Gert Meesters, Marc Legendre over zijn lievelingskind "Alles in Biebel heb ik ooit meegemaakt", StripKap

Belgian comic strips
Belgian comics titles
Belgian comics characters
Satirical comics
1983 comics debuts
2002 comics endings
Humor comics
Gag-a-day comics
Fictional characters from Flanders
Child characters in comics
Comics characters introduced in 1983
Comics set in Belgium
Works set in Flanders
Metafictional comics